Melchior, Freiherr von Diepenbrock (6 January 1798 at Bocholt in Westphalia – 20 January 1853 at the castle of Johannesberg in Jauernig) was a German Catholic Prince-Bishop of Breslau and Cardinal.

Life
He attended the military academy at Bonn and took part in the campaign against France in 1815 as an officer of the militia. Upon his return he was much attracted by the personality of Johann Michael Sailer, a friend of the family, at that time professor at the University of Landshut in Bavaria, and studied public finance at that institution. When Sailer was made Bishop of Ratisbon, Diepenbrock followed him there, took up the study of theology, and was ordained priest 27 December 1823.

In 1835 he was made dean of the cathedral and vicar-general by the successor of Bishop Sailer. His knowledge of modern languages and his administrative ability, together with his understanding of the interior life and his ascetical character, paved the way for his elevation to the episcopal See of Breslau, to which he was elected on 15 January 1845. He at first declined the honor, but finally accepted out of obedience to the mandate of Pope Gregory XVI.

From the beginning of his reign he was called to face difficult problems and momentous political events. There was famine in Upper Silesia. The Revolution of 1848 showed him one of the most loyal supporters of government, law, and order. The pastoral letter which he issued on this occasion was, by order of the king, read in all the Protestant churches of the realm. He devoted his energies to the training of the clergy, opened a preparatory seminary, and improved the conditions of the higher seminary. He was a watchful guardian of ecclesiastical discipline and, when necessary, employed severe measures to enforce it. He reintroduced retreats for the priests and missions for the people.

In 1849 he was appointed Apostolic delegate for the Prussian army. He was created cardinal in the consistory of 20 September 1850, and received the purple 4 November. This event gave occasion to one of the most magnificent public demonstrations ever witnessed in Germany. It was soon followed by the cardinal's death from disease.

His will bequeathed his estate to his diocese. In personal appearance he was of dignified presence, but pleasant and affable to all.

Works

He was a noted preacher and poet. His principal publications are: "Spiritual Bouquet, Gathered in Spanish and German Gardens of Poesy" (Sulzbach, 1826); "Life and Writings of Heinrich Suso" (Ratisbon, 1829); "Sermons" (Ratisbon, 1841); "Pastoral Letters" (Munster, 1853); "Personal Letters" (Frankfort, 1860).

German composer Georgina Schubert (1840-1878) used his text for her lieder “Wiegenlied.”

References 

Chowanetz, Life of Cardinal von Diepenbrock (Osnabruck, 1853)
Forster, Life of Cardinal von Diepenbrock (Ratisbon, 1859)
Cardinal von Diepenbrock (Bonn, 1878)
Karker in Kirchenlexikon

External links

Melchior Diepenbrock - Encyclopedia of Revolutions of 1848

|-

1798 births
1853 deaths
People from Bocholt, Germany
19th-century German cardinals
Cardinals created by Pope Pius IX
Prince-Bishops of Breslau
Members of the Diet of Austrian Silesia
Members of the Frankfurt Parliament
German military personnel of the Napoleonic Wars